Electronic Saviors is a series of cancer charity industrial music compilations of exclusive tracks and mixes compiled by Jim Semonik of Rein[Forced], mastered by Chase Dudley and Wade Allin, and released through Distortion Productions and Metropolis Records. It is heavily promoted through various shows, through radio airplay, podcasts, and via trailers. As of 2019, the collections had raised more than $70,000 for various cancer related charities, and had received an award from the American Society of Colon and Rectal Surgeons (ASCRS).

According to Semonik, Electronic Saviors was inspired by There Is No Time, a compilation of the industrial music scene released by Ras Dva in 1995.

In 2017 the first spin-off album was released and in 2018 the first music video of an Electronic Saviors track debuted on Regen Magazine's website.

The sixth and purportedly final entry in the series was released on June 12, 2020.

Initial release

A fifth "Disc" was included as a digital download.

Volume 2: Recurrence

Electronic Saviors Volume 2: Recurrence is the second Electronic Saviors cancer charity compilation compiled by Jim Semonik of Rein[Forced], a cancer survivor.

Volume 3: Remission

Volume IV: Retaliation

Volume 4 of Electronic Saviors marks the first time KMFDM has contributed to the series; included is a track that was never released on Nihil.

Volume V: Remembrance

References

Charity albums
Compilation album series
Industrial compilation albums
Metropolis Records artists